The UIPM Laser Run World Championships is the premier laser run world championship competition organised by the International Modern Pentathlon Union (UIPM). The competition has been held annually since 2015, with cancellations in 2020 due to COVID-19

Champions

Men's championship

Men's team

Women's championship

Women's team

Mixed relay

Venues

References

Laser Run World Championships
Laser Run